is a mountain of the Akaishi Mountains−"Southern Alps" (南アルプス Minami-Arupusu), in Yamanashi Prefecture, Japan.

It is the second tallest mountain in Japan, after Mount Fuji, and is known as "the Leader of the Southern Alps". It is included in the 100 Famous Japanese Mountains. It is located in Minami Alps National Park, near the city of Minami-Alps.

Geography 

Large clusters of plants can be seen from huts near the top. The species  is endemic to this mountain.

See also
 List of mountains in Japan
 100 Famous Japanese Mountains
 Three-thousanders (in Japan)
 Akaishi Mountains
 List of Ultras of Japan

References

External links
 Topographic map (1:25,000)

Kita
Mount Kitadake
Kita, Mount
Mount Kitadake
Highest points of Japanese national parks